Victor Guerin (born 17 June 1992 in São Paulo) is a professional Brazilian racing driver.

Career

Karting
Guerin had some karting experience, by participating in various Brazilian championships.

Formula Three Sudamericana
Guerin graduated to single-seaters, competing in the Light Class of the local Formula Three Sudamericana championship. He won one race and amassed another four podiums. After ten races in this class, he stepped up to main class, contesting four races, finishing one of them on podium.

Formula Abarth
In 2010, Guerin switched to Europe, joining the newly launched Formula Abarth series in Italy with JD Motorsport. He won the opening race at Magione and amassed another three point-scoring positions, and finished in thirteenth place in the final championship standings.

Italian Formula Three Championship
Guerin stepped up to the Italian Formula Three Championship in 2011, and joined Lucidi Motors. He won the final race of the season at Autodromo Nazionale Monza and collected another four podiums, finishing eighth in the standings.

Auto GP World Series
In 2012 Guerin graduated to Auto GP World Series, joining Super Nova International. He scored his first podium at the Hungaroring, finishing second behind team-mate Adrian Quaife-Hobbs.

FIA Formula Two Championship
Aside from his Auto GP commitments, Guerin appeared in the Algarve round of the FIA Formula Two Championship. He finished the weekend's races in eleventh and ninth places respectively.

GP2 Series
Guerin made his GP2 Series debut at Barcelona, replacing Brendon Hartley at Ocean Racing Technology. He competed in 18 of the series' 24 races, but did not score any points.

NASCAR Whelen Euro Series
Guerin made his stock car racing debut in 2014 when he competed in the NASCAR Whelen Euro Series. Competing with a Chevrolet SS entered by Brazil Team in the Elite 1 class, Guerin finished the season in 11th place with two podium finishes and a total of 4 Top 10 finishes.

Racing record

Career summary

Complete Auto GP World Series results
(key) (Races in bold indicate pole position) (Races in italics indicate fastest lap)

Complete GP2 Series results
(key) (Races in bold indicate pole position) (Races in italics indicate fastest lap)

NASCAR
(key) (Bold – Pole position awarded by qualifying time. Italics – Pole position earned by points standings or practice time. * – Most laps led.)

Whelen Euro Series - Elite 1

References

External links
 

 

1992 births
Living people
Racing drivers from São Paulo
Formula Abarth drivers
Italian Formula Three Championship drivers
Auto GP drivers
Brazilian NASCAR drivers
FIA Formula Two Championship drivers
Formula 3 Sudamericana drivers
GP2 Series drivers
Brazilian GP2 Series drivers
Ocean Racing Technology drivers
Super Nova Racing drivers
JD Motorsport drivers